Nong Khai Nam (เทศบาลตำบลหนองไข่น้ำ) is in the Mueang Nakhon Ratchasima district of Nakhon Ratchasima province, Thailand.  It was created in 1999, and covers 43.44 km2, eight villages and 5,792 citizens.

References

Thesaban of Nakhon Ratchasima Province